Paul Frank Went (12 October 1949 – 4 January 2017) was an English footballer who played professionally for five clubs over a fifteen-year period. He was one of that generation who bridged the gap between terminological eras, beginning his career as a centre-half and ending it as a central defender despite playing a similar role throughout.

Biography 
Born in Bromley-by-Bow on 12 October 1949 he played for both England schoolboys and the Under 18 youth side. After an apprenticeship he broke into the Orient first team in 1966, becoming the club's youngest ever player, and played 50 games for the club before being transferred to Charlton in June 1967.

He spent five years at The Valley before moving to Fulham in the summer of 1972. After only 18 months he was off to Portsmouth, part of new chairman John Deacon's ambitious new rebuilding programme. Manager John Mortimore planned a rock-like central partnership between Went and Malcolm Manley, but the former Leicester defender injured his knee in only his 11th game for the Fratton Park club and never played professionally again. Went, by contrast, was voted "Player of the Year" at the end of his first season.

As financial crisis piled on crisis manager Ian St John cut the wage bill by selling Went to Cardiff City, his last game being a 4–1 away defeat to Shrewsbury. Went's departure opened the door for future England defender Steve Foster, who was switched by St John from attack to defence. Went became a crowd favourite at Ninian Park, replacing Mike England in the Bluebirds' defence. A committed defender, he continued in the relegation decider against Carlisle United, despite a dislocated shoulder. The following season he played as a striker for the cash-strapped Bluebirds at times and netted a consolation goal against Tottenham at White Hart Lane in 1977. After two eventful years in Wales Went returned to his home town to rejoin his first club. As his playing career drew to an end Went was appointed Assistant Manager at Brisbane Road, culminating in a twenty-one day reign as full manager.

Notes

1949 births
2017 deaths
Footballers from Bromley-by-Bow
England youth international footballers
Leyton Orient F.C. players
Charlton Athletic F.C. players
Fulham F.C. players
Portsmouth F.C. players
Cardiff City F.C. players
Leyton Orient F.C. managers
Association football midfielders
English footballers
English football managers
Leyton Orient F.C. non-playing staff